Gary Osborne (born 1949 in London) is an English singer and songwriter. He chaired The Songwriters Executive of the British Academy Of Songwriters Composers and Authors for 12 years during which time he was also chairman of The Ivor Novello Awards.

Career
Born in London in 1949, Osborne is the son of the late musical director Tony Osborne. He was educated in Switzerland and entered the music industry at the age of 15. As a teenage songwriter Osborne had recordings by Timi Yuro, Nana Mouskouri and Val Doonican and at age 17 had his first US chart entry with "On The Other Side" by The Seekers, which he wrote with Tom Springfield.

Osborne's early career included presenting the 1960s radio show Cool Britania on the BBC World Service and a stint with RCA Records in its A&R department. In the early 1970s, he was active in television jingles, writing and performing hundreds of songs for brands including Pepsi, Ultra Brite, Shredded Wheat and Abbey National. 

Osborne and Paul Vigrass recorded two albums, both produced by Jeff Wayne. Their first was Queues, in 1972, containing the hits "Forever Autumn", "Men of Learning" and "Virginia (Be Strong)".  Their second and last was Steppin' Out, with the hit "Gypsy Woman". "Men of Learning" peaked at #84 in Australia in 1972.

Osborne went on to collaborate with Elton John throughout the 1978 album A Single Man, and on parts of the albums 21 at 33, The Fox, Jump Up! and Leather Jackets. The three biggest singles co-written by Elton John and Osborne were "Part-Time Love" from 1978, "Little Jeannie", a U.S. million-seller in 1980, and the worldwide hit "Blue Eyes" from 1982. Osborne was the principal lyricist on the best-selling concept album Jeff Wayne's Musical Version of The War of the Worlds which has sold in excess of 15 million albums and performed half a dozen sold-out UK arena tours as well as touring in Europe and Australia.

Osborne's collaboration with Richard Kerr yielded the US hit "I'm Dreaming" for Jennifer Warnes and "Making The Best of a Bad Situation" for Millie Jackson's Still Caught Up album, as well as cuts by Jimmy Helms, Cliff Richard, Peter Cetera, The Edwin Hawkins Singers and The Righteous Brothers. He co-wrote songs for Albert Hammond's album Somewhere in America (1982).

"I Am the Future", written with Lalo Schifrin for the soundtrack of the movie Class of 1984, was performed by Alice Cooper. Other films featuring Osborne songs include My Own Private Idaho, Stardust, Every Day's a Holiday, Summer Lovers, The Legacy and Oh! Heavenly Dog.

Osborne's credits as a backing vocalist include "Sugar Baby Love" by The Rubettes, "You Can Make Me Dance" by Rod Stewart and The Faces, and "Part-Time Love" by Elton John. More recent work includes the 2006 UK top-3 hit "Checkin' It Out" by Lil' Chris.

References

External links
 [ Allmusic song discography]
 British Academy of Composers and Songwriters article

Living people
English male singer-songwriters
English lyricists
English session musicians
British soft rock musicians
A&R people
1949 births
Date of birth missing (living people)